Dushyanth Sridhar is an Indian film director, writer and public speaker. He delivers discourses in Sanskrit, Tamil and English, and focuses on the scriptures of Sri Bhashyam, Gita Bhashyam, Rahasya-traya Saram, and Bhagavad Vishayam. He has delivered lectures in several countries,. and on Youtube.

Biography
	Dushyanth Sridhar was born into a Tamil family in Bengaluru. His father was a marketing professional and his mother a school teacher. His parents enrolled him in classes at the age of five to study Sanskrit and the Vedas. After studying in schools in Bengaluru and Madras, he studied chemical engineering and chemistry at BITS Pilani and graduated in 2008. By graduation he had already given several upanyasams (religious discourse lectures). After several years in industry, Sridhar became on full-time religious scholar and lecturer in 2016, delivering lectures both in-person and on television. 

	 Dushyanth Sridhar worked one year at the practice school at Century Rayon, Shahad and subsequently worked in the corporate sector in a number of companies including a market research firm in Mumbai and in TCS. In 2016, Sridhar quit working in the corporate sector and currently spends all his time studying the Vedas and delivering lectures on television channels as well as in public gatherings.

Sridhar also develops classical dance and vocal performances, and wrote and starred in the film Vedanta Desika. He also coordinates the restoration of Vedanta Desika shrines and promotes the cause through a charitable trust.

References

Writers from Bangalore
Living people
1986 births
Scholars of Hinduism
20th-century Hindu philosophers and theologians
20th-century Indian philosophers
New Age spiritual leaders
Indian spiritual teachers